William McEvoy (1845 – 14 July 1930) was an Australian cricketer. He played one first-class cricket match for Victoria in 1877.

See also
 List of Victoria first-class cricketers

References

External links
 

1845 births
1930 deaths
Australian cricketers
Victoria cricketers
Cricketers from Sydney
Melbourne Cricket Club cricketers